The 2015–16 Korvpalli Meistriliiga season (also known as the Alexela Korvpalli Meistriliiga for sponsorship reasons) was the 91st season of top-tier basketball in Estonia. TÜ/Rock came into the season as defending champions of the 2014–15 KML season.

The season began on 7 October 2015 and concluded on 27 May 2016 with Kalev/Cramo defeating TÜ/Rock 4 games to 1 in the 2016 KML Finals to win their 8th Estonian Championship.

Teams

Personnel and sponsorship

Coaching changes

Regular season
During the regular season teams will play 4 rounds for 32 games (2 at home and 2 away) with following exceptions:

 TÜ/Rock will play 1 round at home against teams other than Kalev/Cramo (1 round at home and 2 rounds away in total).
 Kalev/Cramo will play 2 rounds away against teams other than TÜ/Rock (1 round at home and 2 rounds away in total).

Double points will be awarded to teams winning those games.

League table

{| class="wikitable" style="text-align: center"
! width=20| !! width=200|Team !! width=30| !! width=30| !! width=30|  !! width=30| !! width=30| !!width=200| Qualification
|- bgcolor=#CCFFCC
|1||align="left"|Kalev/Cramo||32|| 32|| 0|| 64|| 
| rowspan=8 align="center"|Qualification to Playoffs
|- bgcolor=#CCFFCC
|2||align="left"|TÜ/Rock||32|| 25|| 7|| 57|| 
|- bgcolor=#CCFFCC
|3||align="left"|TLÜ/Kalev||32|| 19|| 13|| 51|| 
|- bgcolor=#CCFFCC
|4||align="left"|AVIS Rapla||32|| 18|| 14|| 50|| 
|- bgcolor=#CCFFCC
|5||align="left"|Rakvere Tarvas||32|| 16|| 16|| 48|| 
|- bgcolor=#CCFFCC
|6||align="left"|Port of Pärnu||32|| 13|| 19|| 45|| 
|- bgcolor=#CCFFCC
|7||align="left"|TTÜ|| 32|| 11|| 21|| 43|| 
|- bgcolor=#CCFFCC
|8||align="left"|Valga-Valka/Maks & Moorits|| 32|| 10|| 22|| 42|| 
|-
|9||align="left"|Audentes/Noortekoondis||32|| 0 || 32|| 32|| 
| rowspan=1 align"center"|

Results

Playoffs

Bracket
The playoffs began on 14 April and ended on 27 May. The tournament concluded with Kalev/Cramo defeating TÜ/Rock 4 games to 1 in the 2016 KML Finals.

Individual statistics
Players qualify to this category by having at least 50% games played.

Points

Rebounds

Assists

Awards

Finals MVP
 Rolands Freimanis (Kalev/Cramo)

Best Defender
 Janar Talts (TÜ/Rock)

Best Young Player
 Norman Käbin (Port of Pärnu)

Coach of the Year
 Alar Varrak (Kalev/Cramo)

All-KML Team

Player of the Month

See also
 2015–16 FIBA Europe Cup
 2015–16 VTB United League
 2015–16 Baltic Basketball League
 2015–16 Latvian Basketball League

References

External links
 Official website

Korvpalli Meistriliiga seasons
Estonian
KML